Scott Jessop, known by his online alias IamSkippy, (born 29 October 1977) is an American Internet celebrity. Jessop is known for his original appearance in the TLC TV Series, Virgin Diaries which he appeared on in 2012.

He uploads regular videos on his own YouTube channel about his life and showcasing dates that he regularly goes on. Jessop is also known for his work and appearance with the documentary film, Sundance Skippy.

Early life 
Jessop was born in Orem, Utah. He was raised in a Mormon community. He is a graduate from Utah Valley University where he studied broadcast journalism.

Career
In 2010, Jessop appeared as part of the documentary film, Sundance Skippy. In the film, Jessop would approach celebrities for photos.

Scott first appeared on the TLC Original Series, Virgin Diaries. He appeared on the show about his own virginity and celibacy.

He has since grown his own online presence through videos on his YouTube channel.

Jessop has appeared on several podcasts including the H3 Podcast in 2020 and the Fresh&Fit Podcast in 2021.

References

External links
IamSkippy YouTube Channel

Living people
American YouTubers
1977 births